Traulia ornata is a species of short-horned grasshopper in the family Acrididae. It is found in south and eastern Asia.

Subspecies
These subspecies belong to the species Traulia ornata:
 Traulia ornata amamiensis Yamasaki, 1966
 Traulia ornata chui Yamasaki, 1991
 Traulia ornata iriomotensis Yamasaki, 1966
 Traulia ornata ishigakiensis Yamasaki, 1966
 Traulia ornata okinawaensis
 Traulia ornata okinawensis Yamasaki, 1966
 Traulia ornata ornata Shiraki, 1910
 Traulia ornata yonaguniensis Yamasaki, 1966

References

External links

 

Catantopinae